The 1991 Campeonato Nacional, was the 59th season of top-flight football in Chile. Colo-Colo won its eighteenth title following a 0–0 away draw against Coquimbo Unido on 18 December. Coquimbo Unido, as runner-up, and Universidad Católica, as Liguilla winners, also qualified for the next Copa Libertadores .

Final table

Results

Topscorers

Title

Liguilla Pre-Copa Libertadores

Preliminary round

* Qualified as "Best Loser"

Universidad Católica also qualified for the 1992 Copa Libertadores

Promotion/relegation Liguilla

  
Everton and Universidad de Chile will play in the 1992 Primera División

See also
1991 Copa Chile

Notes

Sources
RSSSF Page

Primera División de Chile seasons
Chile
1991 in Chilean football